FAKHRAVAC is a COVID-19 vaccine developed in Iran by the Organization of Defensive Innovation and Research, a subsidiary of Iran's Ministry of Defense. It's the third Iranian COVID-19 vaccine reaching clinical trials. It's currently in phase III. It has received emergency use authorization in Iran on 9 September 2021.

The vaccine is named after the Iranian nuclear scientist Mohsen Fakhrizadeh. According to the Iranian authorities, he was working on a vaccine in response to the COVID-19 pandemic in Iran. Fakhrizadeh was assassinated in November 2020 in an attack Iran and US intelligence attributed to Israel.

Medical uses 
It requiring two doses given by intramuscular injection 3 weeks apart.

Pharmacology 
FAKHRAVAC is an inactivated virus-based vaccine.

Manufacturing 
In August 2021, production capacity of the vaccine is reported to be 1 million dose per month and is planned to be "multiplied in a few months ". In October 2021, the production has reported to be stopped amid Iran's growing vaccine imports. In January 2022, the Director General of Health of the Ministry of Defense announced that the first shipment (around 462,000 doses) of the vaccine had been delivered to the Iranian Ministry of Health.

Clinical trials

Authorizations

FAKHRAVAC received emergency use authorization in Iran on 9 September 2021. In October 2021, Iran's Food and Drug Administration was considering giving full authorization to the vaccine for third/booster dose.

See also 
 Pharmaceuticals in Iran
 COVID-19 pandemic in Iran
 COVID-19 vaccine clinical research

References 

Clinical trials
Iranian COVID-19 vaccines
Science and technology in Iran
Inactivated vaccines